Yellowman Versus Josey Wales – Two Giants Clash, colloquially known as Two Giants Clash, is a single split album by the Jamaican reggae and dancehall deejays Yellowman and Josey Wales.

In 1984, it was released as Two Giants Clash in the United States by Greensleeves Records.

Content
The album includes five songs from both Yellowman and Josey Wales, pitting them in a "rap battle" against each other. Stephen Cook of AllMusic called the album a "highlight" of the dancehall era of the late 1970s and early 1980s.

Track listing

Yellowman side A

Josey Wales side B

References 

1984 albums
Yellowman albums
Josey Wales albums